Wrzos ("The Heather") is a 1938 Polish melodrama film directed by Juliusz Gardan. It is based on the novel by Maria Rodziewiczówna.

Cast
Stanisława Angel-Engelówna - Kazia
Franciszek Brodniewicz - Andrzej Sanicki
Hanna Brzezińska - Celina
Mieczysław Cybulski - Stach Boguski
Mieczysława Ćwiklińska - Ramszycowa
Stanisława Wysocka - Stach's grandmother
Kazimierz Junosza-Stępowski - Sanicki, Andrzej's father 
Aleksander Zelwerowicz - Kazia's father
Lidia Wysocka - Dębska
Leszek Pośpiełowski - Radlicz
Janina Janecka - Kazia's stepmother
Władysław Grabowski - count Kołocki
Wanda Jarszewska - Wolska

External links 
 
 Wrzos at filmpolski.pl

1930s Polish-language films
Polish black-and-white films
1938 drama films
1938 films
Films directed by Juliusz Gardan
Films based on Polish novels
Władysław Szpilman
Polish drama films
Melodrama films